Teenage Hate is the debut studio album by the American garage punk band, The Reatards. It was released in 1998 via Goner Records.

Goner Records reissued the album on May 17, 2011, one year after Jay Reatard's death. The posthumous release included two rare recordings, The Reatards Cassette and Fuck Elvis Here's The Reatards Cassette, which have been previously released on only cassette format. These were included in the bonus disc. The reissue, which includes covers from artists such as The Beatles, Buddy Holly, Fear, Lil' Bunnies, The Litter, and The Dead Boys, met with a critical acclaim.

The album features elements from various music genres, such as garage rock, punk rock, southern rock, power pop, blues and rockabilly. The recording utilizes a raw lo-fi sound, which makes it sound like "it was recorded on a telephone". The album also juxtaposes hooks and choruses with highly dissonant guitars and screaming, which were compared to those of Black Francis of Pixies.

Track listing

Personnel
Album personnel, as adapted from Allmusic and Discogs:

Elvis Wong Reatard – drums 
Steve Albundy Reatard – guitar, backing vocals 
Jay Reatard – guitar, vocals
Doug Easley – mastering
Jason Ward – mastering

References

External links
"Teenage Hate" on Goner Records' official website

1998 debut albums
Jay Reatard albums
Garage punk albums